Frank ("Frankie") Liles (born February 14, 1965) is an American former professional boxer who held the Lineal and WBA super-middleweight titles.

Amateur career 
Liles won a bronze medal at the 1987 Pan American Games.  Liles had a stellar amateur career, compiling an Amateur Record of 285-14.

Amateur Highlights 
1985 3rd place National Golden Gloves as a Welterweight
1986 National Golden Gloves Champion as a Welterweight
1986 US Olympic Festival Gold Medalist as a Welterweight - Decisioning Lenny Gargagliano Houston Texas
1987 Runner-up United States Amateur Championships as a Welterweight
1987 3rd place at Pan-American Games as a Light Middleweight
1987 United States Amateur Champion at Light Middleweight
1988 Runner-up for Olympic team berth at Light Middleweight, was decisioned twice by Roy Jones Jr. after defeating Jones twice in 1987 including a 3-0 decision in which Jones received 2 standing eight counts.

Professional boxing career
Known as "Fabulous", Liles had a very successful pro career that began in 1988. Liles lost to Tim Littles on points in 1992. In 1994 he beat Steve Little to capture the Lineal and WBA super middleweight titles. He successfully defended the title against seven different fighters over a five-year span, including over Michael Nunn, Segundo Mercado and Tim Littles. He tried many times to get a fight with his amateur nemesis Roy Jones Jr. unsuccessfully. He lost his title to Byron Mitchell in 1999 and retired in 2002.

Professional boxing record

Career as a trainer 
Liles worked as a trainer for the Japanese kickboxing organization called K-1 from 2003–2009.  He spent a great deal of time training athletes oversees, mostly in Japan.  Liles was the head trainer for several K-1 fighters including Musashi, Remy Bonjasky, & Bob Sapp.  Liles has also worked with many boxers including the likes of Manny Pacquiao, whose trainer Freddie Roach was Frankie's trainer for much of his career.

See also
List of world super-middleweight boxing champions

References

External links

"Fabulous" Frankie Liles - CBZ Profile

|-

1965 births
Living people
American male boxers
Boxers from New York (state)
Sportspeople from Syracuse, New York
African-American boxers
National Golden Gloves champions
Winners of the United States Championship for amateur boxers
Boxers at the 1987 Pan American Games
Pan American Games bronze medalists for the United States
Pan American Games medalists in boxing
Medalists at the 1987 Pan American Games
World super-middleweight boxing champions
World Boxing Association champions